is a Japanese mixed martial artist. Shimizu fought primarily in Pancrase, as well as Shooto and Sengoku.

He is a former Flyweight King Of Pancrase, where he holds the joint record for consecutive title defenses (6). He is currently the #2 ranked bantamweight (123 lbs) in Shooto.

Early life
Kiyotaka Shimizu was born in Ishibashi and attended the Sakushin Gakuin High School. He initially belonged to the basketball club, and was expected to take over the family shop. He became interested in martial arts in the second year of high school. He would eventually move to Tokyo and joined the SK Absolute gym.

Mixed martial arts career

Pancrase
He would begin his career as an amateur kickboxer, participating in the 2007 KAMINARIMON CLIMAX tournament, fighting in the 121 lbs weight class. He won all four fights, including the final against Yudai Sudo.

Shimizu won the Flyweight Neo Blood flyweight tournament 15th. In the first round he beat Toshihiro Shimizu with a rear naked choke. He won the same way against Takuma Ishii in the semifinals. In the finals he beat Yuichiro Yajima through a unanimous decision.

On February 7, 2010, Shimizu challenged Mituhisa Sunabe, the former Flyweight King Of Pancrase. and he became the new flyweight King Of Pancrase. He would go on to defend the title against Isao Hirose and Mitsuhisa Sunabe.

On April 3, 2011, Pancrase Inc. has changed from 125 lb In 120 lb weight limit of the flyweight. Pancrase was changed to "super flyweight" from the "flyweight" the name of the class 125 lb. And, Shimizu has been moved to the super flyweight King Of Pancrase. He would fight Sunabe for the third time and beat him through a majority decision, as well as defending against Seiji Ozuka.

On December 1, 2012, Shimizu successfully defended the Super Flyweight King of Pancrase title against top contender Yuki Yasunaga of the 3rd round via KO at main event of year end "Progress Tour", and would defend for the sixth time against Atsushi Yamamoto.

During Pancrase 273 he faced Ryuichi Miki in a flyweight Championship assessment bout, and lost a unanimous decision.

Shooto
Moving from Pancrase to other organizations he accumulated an 8–5 record. Unsuccessful in Vale Tudo Japan, he nevertheless achieved a remarkable 5–1 record with Shooto which earned him a chance to challenge for the Shooto Bantamweight (123 lb) Championship against Hiromasa Ougikubo. He would lose by way of TKO in the first round.

Shimizu was scheduled to fight Takahiro Kohori at Shooto 0531. He won the fight by a first-round TKO.

Shimizu was next scheduled to face Tatsuro Taira at Shooto 0329 on March 29, 2020. However, the event was cancelled due to the COVID-19 pandemic. The bout was then rebooked to take place at Shooto 1123 on November 23, 2020 and lost the fight via unanimous decision.

Shimizu faced Yuto Uda at Shooto 0516, on May 16, 2021. He lost the fight via unanimous decision.

Shimizu faced the undefeated Wataru Yamauchi at Shooto 2022 Vol.7 on November 27, 2022, in his retirement bout. He lost the fight by a first-round technical knockout.

Championships and accomplishments

Kickboxing
KAMINARIMON CLIMAX
2007 KAMINARIMON CLIMAX 55 kg Amateur Tournament Championship

Sambo
East Japan Sambo Championship
7th East Japan Sambo 62 kg Championship

Mixed martial arts
Pancrase
Pancrase Neo Blood Tournament Winner (2009)
Super Flyweight King of Pancrase Championship (One time; Former)
Six successful title defenses

Mixed martial arts record

|-
| Loss
| align=center|25–18–3
| Wataru Yamauchi
| TKO (Punches)
| Shooto – Professional Shooto 2022 Vol. 7
| 
| align=center| 1
| align=center| 0:44
| Tokyo, Japan
|-
| Loss
| align=center|25–17–3
| Yuto Uda
| Decision (unanimous)
| Shooto – Professional Shooto 2021 Vol. 3
| 
| align=center| 3
| align=center| 5:00
| Tokyo, Japan
|
|-
| Loss
| align=center|25–16–3
| Tatsuro Taira
| Decision (unanimous)
| Shooto 1123
| 
| align=center| 3
| align=center| 5:00
| Tokyo, Japan
|
|-
| Win
| align=center| 25–15–3
| Takahiro Kohori 
| TKO (Punches)
| Shooto 0531
| 
| align=center| 1
| align=center| 4:34
| Tokyo, Japan
|-
| Win
| align=center| 24–15–3
| Shojin Miki
| TKO (Punches)
| Shooto - 30th Anniversary Tour 8th Round
| 
| align=center| 1
| align=center| 4:19
| Tokyo, Japan
| 
|-
| Win
| align=center| 23–15–3
| Taiki Akiba
| KO (Punch)
| ONE Japan Series: Road to Century
| 
| align=center| 1
| align=center| 2:15
| Tokyo, Japan
| 
|-
| Loss
| align=center| 22–15–3
| Hiromasa Ougikubo
| Decision (unanimous)
| Shooto 5/6 at Korakuen Hall: 30th Anniversary Tour
| 
| align=center| 5
| align=center| 5:00
| Tokyo, Japan
| 
|-
| Win
| align=center| 22–14–3
| Yoshiro Maeda
| TKO (punches)
| Shooto 1/27 at Korakuen Hall: 30th Anniversary Tour
| 
| align=center| 1
| align=center| 4:37
| Tokyo, Japan
|
|-
| Win
| align=center| 21–14–3
| Hayato Ishii
| TKO (punches)
| Shooto: Professional Shooto 9/23
| 
| align=center| 1
| align=center| 4:09
| Tokyo, Japan
|
|-
| Win
| align=center| 20–14–3
| Koki Naito
| Decision (unanimous)
| Shooto: Professional Shooto 7/15
| 
| align=center| 3
| align=center| 5:00
| Tokyo, Japan
|
|-
| Loss
| align=center| 19–14–3
| Yosuke Saruta
| Decision (unanimous)
| Shooto: Professional Shooto 1/28
| 
| align=center| 3
| align=center| 5:00
| Tokyo, Japan
|
|-
| Win
| align=center| 19–13–3
| Takaki Soya
| KO (punches)
| Shooto: Professional Shooto 5/12
| 
| align=center| 3
| align=center| 0:32
| Tokyo, Japan
|
|-
| Win
| align=center| 18–13–3
| Hiroshi Osato
| KO (punch)
| Shooto: Professional Shooto 3/24
| 
| align=center| 1
| align=center| 3:44
| Tokyo, Japan
|
|-
| Win
| align=center| 17–13–3
| Takahiro Furumaki
| Decision (unanimous)
| Tribe Tokyo Fight: TTF Challenge 06
| 
| align=center| 3
| align=center| 5:00
| Nerima, Tokyo, Japan
|
|-
| Loss
| align=center| 16–13–3
| Ryuichi Miki
| Decision (unanimous)
| Pancrase 273
| 
| align=center| 3
| align=center| 5:00
| Tokyo, Japan
|
|-
| Loss
| align=center| 16–12–3
| Masaaki Sugawara
| Decision (split)
| Vale Tudo Japan: 7th 
| 
| align=center| 3
| align=center| 5:00
| Urayasu, Chiba, Japan
|
|-
| Loss
| align=center| 16–11–3
| Takeshi Kasugai
| Decision (split)
| Vale Tudo Japan: VTJ in Osaka
| 
| align=center| 3
| align=center| 5:00
| Osaka, Japan
|
|-
| Loss
| align=center| 16–10–3
| Yusaku Nakamura
| Decision (split)
| Tribe Tokyo Fight: TTF Challenge 04
| 
| align=center| 3
| align=center| 5:00
| Tokyo, Japan
|
|-
| Win
| align=center| 16–9–3
| Yuya Shibata
| KO (slam and punches)
| Deep - Dream Special 2014: Omisoka Special
| 
| align=center| 1
| align=center| 2:41
| Saitama, Japan
| 
|-
| Win
| align=center| 15–9–3
| Yasutaka Ishigami
| TKO (doctor stoppage)
| Tribe Tokyo Fight: TTF Challenge 02
| 
| align=center| 1
| align=center| 5:00
| Tokyo, Japan
| 
|-
| Win
| align=center| 14–9–3
| Atsushi Yamamoto
| TKO (soccer kicks)
| Pancrase - 257
| 
| align=center| 1
| align=center| 4:54
| Yokohama, Japan
| 
|-
| Loss
| align=center| 13–9–3
| Yuki Motoya
| Decision (unanimous)
| Deep - 64 Impact
| 
| align=center| 3
| align=center| 5:00
| Tokyo, Japan
| 
|-
| Loss
| align=center| 13–8–3
| Kentaro Watanabe
| Decision (split)
| Shooto - 3rd Round 2013
| 
| align=center| 3
| align=center| 5:00
| Tokyo, Japan
| 
|-
| Win
| align=center| 13–7–3
| Fumihiro Kitahara
| Decision (majority)
| Shooto - Gig Tokyo 13
| 
| align=center| 3
| align=center| 5:00
| Tokyo, Japan
| 
|-
| Win
| align=center| 12–7–3
| Yuki Yasunaga
| KO (punch)
| Pancrase - Progress Tour 14
| 
| align=center| 3
| align=center| 2:02
| Tokyo, Japan
| 
|-
| Win
| align=center| 11–7–3
| Masaaki Sugawara
| Decision (unanimous)
| Shooto - Gig Tokyo 11
| 
| align=center| 3
| align=center| 5:00
| Tokyo, Japan
| 
|-
| Loss
| align=center| 10–7–3
| Haruo Ochi
| Decision (majority)
| Shooto - 3rd Round
| 
| align=center| 3
| align=center| 5:00
| Tokyo, Japan
| 
|-
| Draw
| align=center| 10–6–3
| Seiji Ozuka
| Draw (majority)
| Pancrase - Progress Tour 1
| 
| align=center| 3
| align=center| 5:00
| Tokyo, Japan
| 
|-
| Loss
| align=center| 10–6–2
| Shinichi Kojima
| Decision (unanimous)
| Shooto: Shooto the Shoot 2011
| 
| align=center| 3
| align=center| 5:00
| Tokyo, Japan
| 
|-
| Win
| align=center| 10–5–2
| Mitsuhisa Sunabe
| Decision (majority)
| Pancrase: Impressive Tour 5
| 
| align=center| 3
| align=center| 5:00
| Tokyo, Japan
| 
|-
| Win
| align=center| 9–5–2
| Junya Kodo
| Submission (rear-naked choke)
| Shooto: Shootor's Legacy 2
| 
| align=center| 2
| align=center| 3:16
| Tokyo, Japan
| 
|-
| Win
| align=center| 8–5–2
| Ichiro Sugita
| Decision (split)
| World Victory Road Presents: Soul of Fight
| 
| align=center| 1
| align=center| 5:00
| Tokyo, Japan
| 
|-
| Draw
| align=center| 7–5–2
| Mitsuhisa Sunabe
| Draw
| Pancrase: Passion Tour 11
| 
| align=center| 3
| align=center| 5:00
| Tokyo, Japan
| 
|-
| Win
| align=center| 7–5–1
| Isao Hirose
| TKO (doctor stoppage)
| Pancrase: Passion Tour 6
| 
| align=center| 2
| align=center| 3:06
| Tokyo, Japan
| 
|-
| Win
| align=center| 6–5–1
| Mitsuhisa Sunabe
| Decision (majority)
| Pancrase: Passion Tour 1
| 
| align=center| 3
| align=center| 5:00
| Tokyo, Japan
| 
|-
| Loss
| align=center| 5–5–1
| Mamoru Yamaguchi
| Decision (majority)
| Shooto: Revolutionary Exchanges 3
| 
| align=center| 3
| align=center| 5:00
| Tokyo, Japan
| 
|-
| Win
| align=center| 5–4–1
| Takuya Eizumi
| Decision (unanimous)
| Pancrase: Changing Tour 6
| 
| align=center| 2
| align=center| 5:00
| Tokyo, Japan
| 
|-
| Win
| align=center| 4–4–1
| Yuichiro Yajima
| Decision (unanimous)
| Pancrase: Changing Tour 4
| 
| align=center| 2
| align=center| 5:00
| Tokyo, Japan
| 
|-
| Win
| align=center| 3–4–1
| Takuma Ishii
| Submission (rear-naked choke)
| Pancrase: Changing Tour 3
| 
| align=center| 1
| align=center| 4:00
| Tokyo, Japan
| 
|-
| Win
| align=center| 2–4–1
| Toshihiro Shimizu
| Submission (rear-naked choke)
| Pancrase: Changing Tour 2
| 
| align=center| 2
| align=center| 0:59
| Tokyo, Japan
| 
|-
| Loss
| align=center| 1–4–1
| Yasuhiro Urushitani
| TKO (doctor stoppage)
| Cage Force EX Eastern Bound
| 
| align=center| 1
| align=center| 3:06
| Tokyo, Japan
| 
|-
| Draw
| align=center| 1–3–1
| Takuma Ishii
| Draw
| Pancrase: Shining 8
| 
| align=center| 2
| align=center| 5:00
| Tokyo, Japan
| 
|-
| Loss
| align=center| 1–3
| Mitsuhisa Sunabe
| Decision (unanimous)
| Pancrase: Real 2008
| 
| align=center| 2
| align=center| 5:00
| Tokyo, Japan
| 
|-
| Loss
| align=center| 1–2
| Toshihiro Shimizu
| Submission (armbar)
| Pancrase: Shining 3
| 
| align=center| 1
| align=center| 4:32
| Tokyo, Japan
| 
|-
| Loss
| align=center| 1–1
| Ryota Sasaki
| Decision (unanimous)
| Pancrase: 2008 Neo-Blood Tournament Eliminations
| 
| align=center| 2
| align=center| 3:00
| Tokyo, Japan
| 
|-
| Win 
| align=center| 1–0
| Takuma Ishii
| Submission (rear-naked choke)
| Pancrase: 2008 Neo-Blood Tournament Eliminations
| 
| align=center| 1
| align=center| 1:30
| Tokyo, Japan
|

Mixed martial arts amateur record

|-
| Win 
| align=center| 1–0
| Atsushi Kawakami
| Submission (rear-naked choke)
| Pancrase: Hybrid Bout in Utsunomiya 3
| 
| align=center| 1
| align=center| 3:35
| Utsunomiya, Tochigi, Japan
|

See also
 List of current mixed martial arts champions
 List of male mixed martial artists

References

External links

1984 births
Living people
Japanese male mixed martial artists
Flyweight mixed martial artists
Mixed martial artists utilizing sambo
Japanese sambo practitioners